Indestructible is a 2018 Russian war film directed by Konstantin Maksimov. It was developed under the working title Tankers.

On 9 September 2018, a special private screening of the film for military personnel of the Tamanskaya and Kantemirov Divisions took place; the event took place on Tanker's Day.

The film was released in Russia on 25 October 2018 by 20th Century Fox CIS.

Plot
The film opens with tank commander Semyon Konovalov's KV-1 hunting and destroying a German PzKpfw IV. Later, Konovalov's tank is ambushed and destroyed, along with his platoon. He is injured but survives. It is the second crew he has lost.
The Deputy Political Officer of the Battalion (Major Vladimir Krotov) feels Konovalov should be court martialed, but the commanding officer refuses.
An engineer from the Kirov tank factory arrives at the battalion with fresh tanks. She is Pavla Chumak, but later we discover she is actually Konovalov's wife. Krotov is unaware of this and tries to woo her. 
Captain Konovalov reports back to duty and is given a new crew and a KV-1.
Still unaware of the connection, Krotov becomes jealous when he sees Konovalov and Chumak together, leading him to send Konovalov's tank on a patrol with two T-34 tanks, knowing full well that the KV-1 is not fit for action. Sure enough, the tank cannot keep up with the others and is ordered back. Instead, Konovalov decides to take up a defensive position and engage three German tanks, which he destroys. However, he is disciplined for disobeying orders and told to go into the upcoming assault as tank-borne infantry. 
Chumak desperately tries to get Konovalov's KV-1 ready for the battle, but fails. She then is told that another KV-1 is hidden in the woods near the battle site. She finds it and gets it engine working. Konovalov and his surviving crew members join her and go into battle.
They first destroy a German half-track, which is then joined by an unknown number of tanks, most of which Konovalov's tank destroys. They are finally stopped by another PzKpfw IV, but Konovalov and two surviving crew members kill the German tank crew and drive it back to their lines.

Cast
  as Captain , tank commander
 Vladimir Epifantsev as Sergeant Siitov, gunner
  as Junior lieutenant Rykov, Senior Military Technician
 Olga Pogodina as Pavla Chumak, a production engineer, Semyon Konovalov’s wife
  as Major Vladimir Krotov, Deputy Political Officer of the Battalion
 Nikolai Dobrynin as Basich, a legless surgeon
 Vasily Sedykh as Junior sergeant Bogdan Shinkevich, driver
 Vladimir Kochetkov as Gubkin, radio operator-machine gunner
 Vasily Stepanov as Cantor, translator
  as Sable
 Oleg Chudnitsov as Armen
 Markus Kunze
 
 Anton Eskin
 Evgeniy Zelenskiy as Drozdov, tank commander
 Lera Gorin
 Aleksandr Tuarminskiy
 Olga Kavalay-Aksonov
 Maria Arnaut as Galya
 Yaroslav Khimchenko 
 Dmitriy Sokolov as Krotov, a radio operator
 Sergey Rublev
 Ivan Kozhevnikov
 Roman Senkov as Sergeant Cheryshev, tankman
 Yuriy Balitskiy as Ratnikov, tankman

Production

The film actively used computer special effects. More than 150 shots with computer graphics were created by the Russian studio Carboncore-vfx.

Box office
In Russia, Tankers was a box office success.

Criticism 
The film contains a large number of inconsistencies related to the true story of Konovalov's feat and other historical inaccuracies. So, for example, in the film there is military equipment that does not correspond to the period of the described events: props - layout tiered vehicles stylized as German tanks  PzKpfw IVH, which appeared a year later than the action of the film - in 1943, and Soviet tanks T-34-85, which appeared only in 1944. The film received corresponding ratings from critics.

See also
 Cinema of Russia

References

External links
 

2018 films
2010s Russian-language films
2010s action war films
2018 war drama films
2010s historical action films
Russian action war films
Russian war drama films
Russian historical action films
Eastern Front of World War II films
Films set in 1942
Russian World War II films
World War II films based on actual events